Tekao is the highest peak on the island of Nuku Hiva, in the Marquesas Islands.  It is located in the northwest corner of the island, along the border of the Tōvii plateau, in the traditional province of Te Ii.

Landforms of the Marquesas Islands
Mountains of French Polynesia